Camp Hill Cemetery is a cemetery within Halifax, Nova Scotia, Canada. It is located on Camp Hill, adjacent to Robie Street.

History
In 1844, Camp Hill succeeded the city's first cemetery, the Old Burying Ground, which had been established almost 100 years earlier in 1749. Originally run by a private company, the cemetery is now owned and administered by the Halifax Regional Municipality.

As a cemetery in the provincial capital, Camp Hill became the final resting place for many of Nova Scotia's elite. Officials allowed for the burial of Black Canadians in a segregated section of the cemetery. Initially, the resting places of African-Canadian veterans of World War I, unlike other white Canadian veterans, were marked with only flat white stones. This situation has been rectified by the federal department of Veterans Affairs.

The Commonwealth War Graves Commission maintains the war graves of 10 service personnel of World War I and over 80 of World War II.

There are also 17 graves of Norwegian sailors, soldiers and merchant seamen in Camp Hill Cemetery who died in Nova Scotia during World War II. These men were at sea when Germany invaded Norway in 1940. The King and government of Norway ordered the more than 1,000 ships at sea to go to Allied ports.

For many years the cemetery contained a traffic light. The traffic light for the intersection of Robie Street and Jubilee Road was located in the northwest corner of the cemetery, creating a popular boast that Halifax was the only city in the world with a traffic light in a cemetery. However, in 2008 the traffic light was moved outside the cemetery fence.

Notable interments

 Enos Collins (1774–1871), privateer, merchant, banker
 Henry Hezekiah Cogswell
 Viola Desmond (1914–1965), civil rights activist, beautician
 James De Mille (1833–1880), novelist, educator
 Abraham Pineo Gesner (1797–1864), inventor of kerosene; a primary founder of the petroleum industry
 Simon Hugh Holmes (1831–1919), lawyer, journalist, politician
 Joseph Howe (1804–1873), journalist, statesman
 Alexander Keith (1795–1873), brewer, politician
 Jonathan McCully (1809–1877), educator, statesman
 Peter Nordbeck (1789–1861), silversmith and jeweller
 Harry Piers (1870–1940), museum curator, historian
 Roland Richardson (1878–1949), mathematician
 William James Stairs (1819–1906), merchant, banker, politician
 William Machin Stairs  (1789–1865), Bank founder, merchant, statesman
 Robert Stanfield (1914–2003), Premier of Nova Scotia, Federal Opposition Leader; one of Canada's most respected politicians
 William Valentine (1798–1849), painter
 John Taylor Wood (1830–1904), Civil War Confederate Naval Officer, grandson of President Zachary Taylor, nephew of Confederate President Jefferson Davis
 Sir William Young (1799–1887),  politician, Premier of Nova Scotia

Gallery

See also 
 Old Burying Ground (Halifax, Nova Scotia)

References

External links

 
 Photographs of John Taylor Wood's tombstone, Camp Hill Cemetery, Halifax, Nova Scotia
 Photographs of Alexander Keith's monument, Camp Hill Cemetery, Halifax, Nova Scotia
 

Cemeteries in Halifax, Nova Scotia